JRP|Ringier, formerly JRP Editions, is a Swiss publisher of high-quality books on contemporary art.

Founded by Lionel Bovier in Zurich, Switzerland, the company has more than 400 titles in active distribution worldwide, including artists’ books, monographs,  exhibition's catalogues, anthologies and books dedicated to writings by art critics and curators. It also publishes series from external associate editors, e.g., Christoph Keller Editions.

At the core of JRP|Ringier's program lie the books by contemporary artists themselves: the artists’ books. JRP|Ringier has already published influential artists such as Fischli & Weiss, John Armleder, Isa Genzken, Richard Prince, John Baldessari, Mike Kelley, Wolfgang Tillmans, Elaine Sturtevant or Rodney Graham. However the publisher continues to support younger or still overlooked Swiss and international artists, including Urs Fischer, Valentin Carron, Sterling Ruby, Troy Brauntuch, Tony Oursler, Kelley Walker, Mai-Thu Perret or Cyprien Gaillard.

JRP|Ringier's publications have won numerous design awards, including The Most Beautiful Swiss Book and Best Book Design from all over the World. While the Geneva-based studio Gavillet & Rust is responsible for the art direction, other renowned graphic designers such as Norm, M/M Paris, Cornel Windlin, Marie Lusa or Peter Saville have also contributed titles from JRP|Ringier's catalogue.

Company history
JRP Editions (Just Ready to be Published) was founded in 1997 in Geneva, Switzerland, by art curators Lionel Bovier and Christophe Cherix, from their admiration for the small press scene of the 1970s. Between 1997 and 2003, around 30 artists’ books and prints emerged from this non-profit activity based on the founders’ network of friends in the art and academic world, design and printing industry.

In 2004, Lionel Bovier created JRP|Ringier, a new company in partnership with Michael Ringier, the owner of the Zurich-based Swiss media group Ringier AG. Christophe Cherix carried on his activities at the Cabinet des Estampes in Geneva and later at the Museum of Modern Art in New York, of which he became Chief Curator of prints and illustrated books.

Since its creation, JRP|Ringier has produced books at an ever-increasing pace and currently releases about one book a week.

Publishing philosophy

“Editing a book can be very similar to curating a show.” As an independent curator, Lionel Bovier, JRP|Ringier's founder, always considered the exhibition as a medium which can take very different forms, even that of a book. The artists’ books of the 1960s, with their autonomous and democratic qualities, seemed to him the ideal vehicles for art projects. But the production modes typically used by Fluxus artists in the 1970s, the book's materialization through collaborative processes, cheap reproduction techniques and circulation, were as much influential to his understanding of book making.

Another aspect of Lionel Bovier's publishing activities was born of a general dissatisfaction with group exhibition's catalogues (the pseudo-documentation of a project, produced before the show, with the two-pages-by-artist-rule, and the inadequate biographies). He replaced them in his own curatorial activity by another form: the anthology. It allowed him to devise and organize the return of textual material that was used to prepare the show, as well as to open the exhibition to its research. It was important for him to state the unfinished status of an exhibition and the anthology seemed to offer an interesting way out, presenting the show as a mere step in a longer journey.

Awarded books since 2004

The most beautiful Swiss books 2004

Mark Leckey, 7 Windmill Street W1, JRP|Ringier, 2004. 

The most beautiful Swiss books 2005

Cory Arcangel, Beige, JRP|Ringier, 2005. 
Shahrzad, History, JRP|Ringier, 2005. 

The 2005 Jan-Tschichold Award was attributed to Gavillet & Rust, JRP|Ringier's art direction.

The most beautiful Swiss books 2006

Peter Fischli/David Weiss, Fragen & Blumen, JRP|Ringier, 2006. 
Late Shift, JRP|Ringier, 2006. 
Tom Burr, Extrospective, JRP|Ringier, 2006. 
ECAL Typography, We make fonts, JRP|Ringier, 2006. 
HGKZ, Announcements, JRP|Ringier, 2006. 

The most beautiful Swiss books 2007

Dieter Roth, Drawings, JRP|Ringier, 2007. 
Hanspeter Hofmann, Bonheur automatique, JRP|Ringier, 2007. 
Jim Shaw, Distorted Faces & Portraits 1978–2007, JRP|Ringier, 2007. 
Johannes Wohnseifer, Werkverzeichnis 1992–2007, JRP|Ringier, 2007. 
Lyon Biennal, 00s—The History of a Decade that Has not Yet Been Named, JRP|Ringier, 2007. 
Marc Camille Chaimowicz, The World of Interiors, JRP|Ringier, 2007. 
Rirkrit Tiravanija, A Retrospective, JRP|Ringier, 2007. 
It's Time for Action, JRP|Ringier, 2007. 
Wouldn't it be nice..., JRP|Ringier, 2007. 
Carsten Nicolai, Static Fades, JRP|Ringier, 2007. 

Carsten Nicolai's Static Fades also received the Ehren Diplom 2007 (honorary degree) from the Leipzig book design competition (Best Book Design from all over the World).

The most beautiful Swiss books 2008

Minotaure, Chants exploratoires, JRP|Ringier, 2008. 
François-Gédéon Reverdin, Gravures néoclassiques, JRP|Ringier, 2008. 
Henrik Olesen, Some Faggy Gesture, JRP|Ringier, 2008. 
Shifting Identities, (Swiss) Art Now, JRP|Ringier, 2008. 
Bob Nickas, Theft Is Vision, JRP|Ringier, 2008. 

The most beautiful Swiss books 2009

Francis Baudevin, Miscellaneous Abstract, JRP|Ringier, 2009. 
Valentin Carron, Learning from Martigny, JRP|Ringier, 2009. 
Forde 1994–2009, JRP|Ringier, 2009. 
Yann Sérandour, Inside the White Cube, JRP|Ringier, 2009. 
Kiosk, Modes of Multiplication, JRP|Ringier, 2009. 
Ari Marcopoulos, Within Arm's Reach, JRP|Ringier, 2009. 
Boris Groys/Andro Wekua, Wait to Wait, JRP|Ringier, 2009. 
Voids, A Retrospective, JRP|Ringier, 2009. 

Void, A Retrospective also received the Bronze Medal 2009 from the Leipzig book design competition (Best Book Design from all over the World).

The most beautiful Swiss books 2010

Atlas of Transformation, JRP|Ringier, 2010. 
Voici un dessin suisse 1990–2010, JRP|Ringier, 2010. 

The most beautiful Swiss books 2011

John Kelsey, Wade Guyton. Black Paintings, JRP|Ringier, 2011.

References

External links 
Official Page
Gavillet & Cie
Optimo (Gavillet & Rust's foundry)
Marie Lusa

Artists' books
Contemporary art magazines
Graphic design studios
Book publishing companies of Switzerland
Publishing companies established in 2004
Companies based in Zürich
Mass media in Zürich
Visual arts publishing companies
Swiss companies established in 2004
Publishing companies of Switzerland